Enchanted Forest is a board game designed by Alex Randolph and Michel Matschoss that requires players to remember the locations of fairytale treasures. The first edition of the game was published by Ravensburger in Germany in 1981 under the original name Sagaland.

Gameplay 
Before gameplay commences, the scene is set by a king wanting to find an heir to the throne, as in his old age he has borne no children. Through the years, he has heard about the magical and mythical treasures that lie hidden in the Enchanted Forest below his large castle. He therefore proclaims that whoever finds three of these treasures for him will succeed him. From here on in, gameplay begins.

The board consists of a village (the starting place), the Enchanted Forest itself, and the castle to which players will reveal hidden treasures to the king. Each space is a circle and, depending on the edition of the game, the trees that contain pictures of the treasures on their bottom faces will be placed at specifically coloured circles (generally blue or noted by a tree symbol). There are a maximum of six playing pieces and each treasure depicted on the bottom of the thirteen trees corresponds to a card. These thirteen cards are placed face downward at the castle, except the top card (the treasure the king is currently seeking), which is face up.

Movement is focused around throwing two dice. According to the general rule, each dice throw outcome is considered a separate move, e.g., a 6 and 5 could be consider as either 11 in one direction, or 5 in one direction and 6 in the other, or vice versa. As each person throws the dice, his aim is to land on a circle that corresponds to a tree. Once a player lands on that space by the end of his move, he may look under the tree and must remember the treasure found there.

Once a player knows where the currently sought treasure is, he should make his way to the castle. By landing on another specific circle, that player then can guess where the treasure is. If correct, he keeps the top card and the next is turned over. However, if wrong, the player must replace the tree and immediately return to the village.

Once a player gains three treasure cards, the game is over.

Variant 
Another gameplay mechanic includes using "magic", which can either change the top card, move a player to an empty tree space, or move a player to the castle. This, combined with other players' being able to land on each other, sending them back to the village, helps make the game more varied and hence more challenging.

Editions

Sagaland 
 1981
 1982

Enchanted Forest 
 1982
 1987
 1990
 1994

Reception
Alan R. Moon reviewed Enchanted Forest for Games International magazine, and gave it 4 stars out of 5, and stated that "Enchanted Forest is an example of elegant simplicity. It is a must for a gamer's collection."

Awards 
 Spiel des Jahres in 1982

References

External links 
 Enchanted Forest at Ravensburger website

Board games introduced in 1981
Fantasy board games
German games
Alex Randolph games
Ravensburger games
Roll-and-move board games
Spiel des Jahres winners